"Bright Morning Star" is a traditional Appalachian spiritual, the earliest recording of which dates back to 1937. It has been sung by numerous folk artists, but was popularized in the folk revivals of the 1960s and 70s, particularly by The Young Tradition.
	
The song was first collected by Alan and Elizabeth Lomax in Harlan County, Kentucky in 1937 as sung by G. D. Vowell, under the title "Bright Moving Stars are Rising". The origin of the song, however, predates the audio recording. A textual reference for the song exists in Edward Billups's 1854 book The Sweet Songster, a Baptist hymnal from Kentucky. "Bright Morning Stars" appears in Ruth Crawford Seeger's American Folk Songs for Christmas. She credits it to the Archive of American Folksong at the Library of Congress, with the identifier "1379 A1."

Recordings
The song has been recorded by The Pennywhistlers on their 1965 album, A Cool Day and Crooked Corn; by The Young Tradition, live, included on the 1970 compilation album, The Folk Trailer (Trailer LER 2019);; by Emmylou Harris on her 1987 album Angel Band; by The Wailin' Jennys on their 2011 album, Bright Morning Stars; and by Rising Appalachia, who adapt it in their medley "Bright Morning Stars / Bokawak" on their 2015 album, Wider Circles.

References

Citations

Works cited

Source attribution

External links
Bright Morning Stars: Ralph Stanley 1971

Appalachian folk songs